Thế Miếu (Chữ Hán: 世廟), also called Thế Tổ Miếu (Chữ Hán: 世祖廟), is an ancestral temple to Vietnam's emperors in the Imperial City, Huế.

History 
It was constructed at the orders of emperor Minh Mạng in 1822-1823 for the purposes of ancestor worship of the past emperors of the Nguyễn dynasty.
Nine dynastic urns (cửu đỉnh 九鼎) opposite of the Thế Miếu were also cast in 1822 and dedicated to the first nine Nguyen emperors. These urns are similar to the legendary Nine Tripod Cauldrons (Chinese jiǔdǐng 九鼎) of China's Xia, Shang and Zhou Dynasties.

Another temple nearby is the Triệu Tổ miếu.

See also
Taimiao, Beijing
Jongmyo, Seoul

References

Temples in Vietnam
Imperial City of Huế
Jongmyo shrines